Home Free is an album by trumpeter Red Rodney which was recorded in late 1977 and released on the Muse label in 1979.

Reception

The AllMusic review by Scott Yanow stated "This excellent outing has a bit of a jam session feel to it ... By 1977, Rodney's chops were back in prime form, and his mastery of bebop is obvious in these recordings. Worth searching for".

Track listing
 "Starburst" (Richie Cole) – 5:40
 "Out of Nowhere" (Johnny Green, Edward Heyman) – 6:18
 "All the Things You Are" (Jerome Kern, Oscar Hammerstein II) – 9:18
 "Red Rodney Rides Again" (Cole) – 5:47
 "Helene" (Red Rodney) – 5:37
 "Bluebird" (Charlie Parker) – 9:34

Personnel
Red Rodney – trumpet
Richie Cole - alto saxophone
David Schnitter – tenor saxophone
Barry Harris – piano
George Duvivier – bass
Leroy Williams – drums

References

Muse Records albums
Red Rodney albums
1979 albums
Albums produced by Bob Porter (record producer)